A fire pit or a fire hole can vary from a pit dug in the ground to an elaborate gas burning structure of stone, brick, and metal. The defining feature of fire pits is that they are designed to contain fire and prevent it from spreading.

Some recent fire pits have a fire bowl that can be placed in the ground or on legs.

Contemporary types

Pre-made fire pits are the most common form of fire pits and can be purchased from a store. These are commonly made of pre-cast concrete or metal or a combination of metal table and stone.  They burn usually natural gas, propane (LP) or bio ethanol.  Wood-burning fire pits made of metal are also quite common but are under increasing scrutiny due to fire bans and air particulate emissions. 

Natural gas and propane burners in these sorts of pre-fabricated vessels are certified under ANSI (American), CSA (Canadian), and CE (European) standards.  Unregulated and uncertified fire pit burners are increasingly being scrutinized by regulatory authorities and being denied permits.  Fire pits have recommended clearance to combustibles and require at least 5 feet (1.5 m) above the flame and 16 inch (40 cm) circumference from the exterior perimeter of the vessel.

Essentially, a fire pit needs only a hole that can safely contain a fire.  This can be as simple as a hole dug in the ground, or as complex as a holed-out brick or rock pillar.  A wood-burning fire pit should be located at least ten feet (three meters) away from structures for safety.  Use of a fire pit in adverse conditions should be avoided, and basic fire safety precautions apply.

Dakota fire pit 

The Dakota fire pit is an efficient, simple fire design that produces little to no smoke. Two small holes are dug in the ground: one for the firewood and the other to provide a draft of air. Small twigs are packed into the fire hole and readily combustible material is set on top and lit. The fire burns from the top downward, drawing a steady, laminar stream of fresh air from the air hole as it burns. Because the air passes freely around the fuel, near complete combustion is achieved, the result being a fire that burns strongly and brightly and with little or no seen smoke. The Dakota fire pit is a tactical fire used by the United States military as the flame produces a low light signature, reduced smoke, and is easier to ignite under strong wind conditions.

This style of fire pit is said to get its name from the Dakota people, who used it while hunting Bison herds on the Great Plains during
the colonial era of the United States. As well as resisting the strong winds of that area, the design also reduced the risk of causing a prairie fire.

Fire pits in history 
Many cultures, particularly nomadic ones, would cut the turf above the fire-pit in a turf cutting ceremony, replacing the turf afterwards to hide any evidence of the fire. The youth organization Woodcraft Folk also does this.

Archaeological significance
The remains of fire pits preserve information about past cultures. Radiocarbon dating from charcoal found in old fire pits can estimate when regions were first populated or when civilizations died out.  Bones and seeds found in fire pits indicate the diet of that area.

In archaeological terms fire pits are referred to as features because they can be seen and recorded as part of the site but cannot be moved without being destroyed.

See also 
 Fire ring
 Earth oven
 Rocket_stove
 Limepit

References

External links 
 CBS Backyard fire pit article
 Binghamton University Archaeology on the Divide Project
 This Old House: Building A Fire

Fireplaces
Fire
Garden features
Firing techniques